Stabule, also known as stebule or stabuļa. is a Latvian woodwind instrument. The name can apply to variety of wind instruments, but in general sense it is a pipe with 4-8 finger holes. These instruments are 1.5–2.5 cm in diameter and can be anywhere from 20 to 40 cm in length. Stabules have either fipple or reed. Reed stabules were usually made from wood or reed with mouthpiece also made either from reed or wood. Fipple stabules were usually made of wood, although in some areas clay and bark stabules of this type were made and bone stabules have been found by archaeologists. A similar more simple type of stabule without finger holes can be made from willow bark. This type of instrument differs in that its end (opposite to mouthpiece) is plugged. The plug is generally meant for tuning the stabule, but sometimes also used as a slide to adjust tone while playing. All bark stabules were usually made in spring when bark is looser – the features of the stabule are carved right on a fresh broom of willow and the bark is then slid off; the remaining branch is then used to make the fipple and, for the simpler type of stabules, the plug. Due to the natural shrinkage of bark they were short-lived.

Fipple flutes
Latvian musical instruments